Claire Dunne or Claire Dunn may refer to:

 Clare Dunne (Irish actress), born 1988
 Clare Dunn, American country musician
 Claire Dunne, born 1937, an Irish-born Australian actress